Karyn Kiyoko Kusama (born March 21, 1968) is an American filmmaker. She made her directorial and writing feature film debut with the sports drama film Girlfight (2000) for which she received a nomination for the Independent Spirit Award for Best First Feature.

Kusama went on to direct the science fiction action film Æon Flux (2005), based on Peter Chung's animated series of the same name and the cult horror comedy film Jennifer's Body (2009). After working extensively as a television director, Kusama directed the horror film The Invitation (2015), a segment in the all-female horror anthology film XX (2017), and the crime drama film Destroyer (2018).

Kusama has received awards from the Cannes Film Festival and the Sundance Film Festival, and has been nominated for 2 Primetime Emmy Awards.

Early life and education
Kusama was born in St. Louis, Missouri, the daughter of Haruo Kusama, a Japanese child psychiatrist and Susan McGuire, a Midwestern educational psychiatrist. She graduated from Ladue Horton Watkins High School in St. Louis, and in 1990 she earned a BFA in Film & TV from New York University's Tisch School of the Arts.

Career

1996–2009: Girlfight, Æon Flux, and Jennifer's Body
After graduating from NYU, where she won a Mobil Prize for a student film called Sleeping Beauties, Kusama worked as an editor on documentary films, in production on independent film and music videos, as a nanny, and painting houses. Through her nanny job she met filmmaker John Sayles and worked as his assistant for three years while he was making the film Lone Star, as well as the development of his films Men with Guns and Limbo. While working for Sayles, she continued to write screenplays. In 1992, Kusama started boxing at Gleason's Gym in Brooklyn, training with Hector Roca. She began collecting ideas for Girlfight, but didn't start writing it until two years later.

At age 31, Kusama wrote and directed her debut feature, Girlfight. It took several years to find financing for the film, reportedly due to her insistence that the main character be a Latina rather than allowing the film to become a vehicle for a well-known white actress. After financing fell through shortly before shooting began, Girlfight was partially financed by filmmaker John Sayles, for whom she worked as an assistant at the time and who served as a mentor. The film was released in 2000 and won the Director's Prize and shared the Grand Jury Prize at the Sundance Film Festival, as well as the Prix de la Jeunesse at the Cannes Film Festival. With a budget of around US$1 million was critically well received. However, it brought in only US$1,667,000, which was considered a poor return. Despite this, the film launched the career of Michelle Rodriguez, who had no previous acting roles prior to being cast in Girlfight.

In 2005, Kusama directed her second film, Æon Flux, a Paramount Pictures studio production that starred Charlize Theron and had a budget of US$62,000,000. The film had been ushered through production by Paramount studio chief Sherry Lansing but during production Lansing left, which resulted in the film being recut and reworked, with significant changes from Kusama's original vision. Following this experience, Kusama said she would never again work on a film in which she doesn't have control of the final cut. The film was largely panned by critics and grossed $52 million worldwide, putting Kusama's career on ice for years afterwards.

In 2009, Kusama directed the horror film Jennifer's Body, which was written by Diablo Cody and starred Megan Fox and Amanda Seyfried in the lead roles. The film grossed approximately US$31,000,000 on a budget of around US$16,000,000. Despite its box office success, the film received mixed reviews from critics upon its release but has since become a cult classic. The film was critically reassessed over time as a "forgotten feminist classic". According to Cody, the film was marketed incorrectly by executives who focused their efforts on the young male audience. In regards to the reappraisals of the film, Kusama credited its "distinctly female perspective," stating she had intended to make a film where young women could see themselves represented. Kusama has since described working on both Æon Flux and Jennifer's Body as "learning experiences," wherein she learned how to navigate the Hollywood studio system.

2010–present: The Invitation, XX, and Destroyer
In 2013, Kusama directed the short film Speechless. Starting in 2014, Kusama began working regularly in television as a director on several series, such as Halt and Catch Fire, The Man in the High Castle, Casual, Billions, and The Outsider. Kusama was slated to direct an adaptation of Breed, an adult horror novel by Scott Spencer under the pen name Chase Novak. The film was to be produced and written by Kusama's husband Phil Hay and his partner Matt Manfredi, but there have been no updates since the film's announcement.

In 2015, Kusama directed The Invitation, a horror film written by Hay and Manfredi, and starring Logan Marshall-Green. The film was funded by a film consortium called Gamechanger Films, who fund films directed by women. It premiered at the 2015 SXSW Festival, to great acclaim, and was released by Drafthouse Films. The film would win the International Critic's Award at the 2015 Neuchâtel International Fantastic Film Festival, and was also nominated for Best Picture. Other accolades won by the film included Best Film at the 2015 Sitges Film Festival and the Golden Octopus at the 2015 Strasbourg European Fantastic Film Festival.

Part of the film's inspiration were the experiences of loss that Kusama, Hay, and Manfredi had. Kusama's brother, Kevin died when she was young, as did a close friend in New York. The film was shot in sequence, cost US$1 million and was filmed in 20 days in Los Angeles. Due to the low production cost and time of the film, Kusama noted that despite the challenges involved with making a film in this manner she had the creative control she lacked on her previous Hollywood films.

In 2017, Kusama wrote and directed a segment, titled "Her Only Living Son", in the all-female directed anthology horror film XX. In 2018, Kusama directed the crime drama film Destroyer, which starred Nicole Kidman and Tatiana Maslany. According to Kusama, Kidman had lobbied for the part after reading the script. The film made its debut at the Telluride Film Festival to positive reactions for Kusama's direction and Kidman's performance, but disappointed at the box office, grossing slightly over $5 million globally with a budget of over $10 million.

In 2020, a new Dracula film was announced as in development by Blumhouse Productions, featuring Kusama as director and Phil Hay and Matt Manfredi as writers. The film was to be set in modern times and follow the character Mina Harker; however, the film was cancelled in April 2022, just three weeks before it was to start filming.

Themes and style
Kusama's films have been noted for their strong feminist themes, and with the exception of The Invitation, all have featured female protagonists. They are often flawed, with the filmmaker citing an interest in ambiguity and difficulty in characters. Kusama has described herself as a "feminist unapologetically" and has criticized the barriers that women face in the film industry. In addition to themes of feminism, Kusama has also explored existential themes such as loss, despair, and anxiety in her films.

Her interest in being a filmmaker comes from the "disparate elements" of art in storytelling from dialogue to music, and the opportunity that being a filmmaker allows in uniting these elements into a single vision. Kusama's films have often drawn upon and been influenced by her own experiences and connections.

Some of her films have been set in the city of Los Angeles. On the city's usage in The Invitation, Kusama said that despite the film being primarily set and shot in a single interior space it had to be set in Los Angeles due to the mythology and history of the city and the surrounding Southern California region. With Destroyer, she aimed to authentically depict parts of the city not often seen in popular culture, resulting in its location shooting going "off the beaten path."

Personal life
Kusama married screenwriter Phil Hay in October 2006. They have a son. Although they had known each other since meeting at Sundance when Girlfight premiered in 2000, it wasn't until they worked together on Æon Flux that they began dating.

Hay has co-written three of her films with his writing partner Matt Manfredi. Together the trio formed Familystyle Films, under which Destroyer was released.

Kusama has named Jonathan Glazer and Jacques Audiard as two current filmmakers who have influenced her. She also said Chantal Akerman's arthouse film Jeanne Dielman is one of her favorite female-directed films. Kusama was initially inspired to make films–particularly centered around women–by her viewings of Amy Heckerling's Fast Times at Ridgemont High (1982) as well as Martha Coolidge's Valley Girl (1983).

Filmography
Feature films
 Girlfight (2000) (Also writer)
 Æon Flux (2005)
 Jennifer's Body (2009)
 The Invitation (2015)
 Destroyer (2018)

Short films

Television

Awards and nominations

References

Further reading

External links
 

1968 births
American women film directors
English-language film directors
Living people
American women screenwriters
Tisch School of the Arts alumni
American film directors of Japanese descent
Sundance Film Festival award winners
Ladue Horton Watkins High School alumni
People from St. Louis
Horror film directors
Film directors from Missouri
Emmy Award winners